Kevin Kraus (born 12 August 1992) is a German professional footballer who plays for 2. Bundesliga side 1. FC Kaiserslautern as a centre back.

Career
Kraus passed through the youth teams of Eintracht Frankfurt and in 2011 got a roster spot in the senior team, making his debut against Hannover on 16 January 2011.

On 13 May 2014, he signed a two-year contract with 1. FC Heidenheim.

Honours
Greuther Fürth
 2. Bundesliga: 2011–12

References

External links
 
 
 

1992 births
Living people
Sportspeople from Wiesbaden
Association football central defenders
Association football fullbacks
German footballers
Germany youth international footballers
SV Wehen Wiesbaden players
Eintracht Frankfurt players
Eintracht Frankfurt II players
SpVgg Greuther Fürth players
1. FC Heidenheim players
1. FC Kaiserslautern players
Bundesliga players
2. Bundesliga players
3. Liga players
Footballers from Hesse